The National Museum of Patriotism was physically a museum in Atlanta Georgia which was founded by retired UPS executive Nicholas Snider. At its peak, the museum occupied a 10,000-square-foot site on Spring Street in Midtown Atlanta. It was closed in 2010 and moved to an online-only presence.

History
The National Museum of Patriotism was founded by Nicholas D. Snider, a former vice president of the United Parcel Service. It was located in Atlanta, Georgia, opening in premises at 1405 Spring Street on July 4, 2004, and moved to a site at 275 Baker St, in the Centennial Olympic Park near the Georgia Aquarium and The World of Coca-Cola. Jim Balster was the museum's first executive director, followed by Jim Stapleton and then Pat Stansbury.

In April 2009, the Patriotism in Entertainment and Music exhibit was opened in a ceremony attended by Kenny Gamble, Miss USO(Heidi-Marie Ferren) and Patti LaBelle. At the same time, the museum inaugurated its Patriot Award: whose recipients include LaBelle and Gamble, Lee Greenwood, Cowboy Crush, The Bob Hope Foundation, and Access Hollywood.

Closure
In July 2010, the museum was forced to close and rebranded itself as the 'National Foundation Of Patriotism' and planned an online virtual museum.  The museum auctioned off some of its exhibits and artifacts.

References
Content for this article written by Pat Stansbury, Center Director.  National Museum of Patriotism, National Foundation of Patriotism.

External links
 

Museums in Atlanta
History museums in Georgia (U.S. state)
Defunct museums in Georgia (U.S. state)
Museums disestablished in 2010
Museums established in 2004